The Sierra Blanca Limestone is a geologic formation in California. It preserves fossils dating back to the Paleogene period.

See also

 List of fossiliferous stratigraphic units in California
 Paleontology in California

References
 

Paleogene California
Geology of Santa Barbara County, California
Limestone formations of the United States
Santa Ynez Mountains
Geologic formations of California